Endotricha dispergens is a species of snout moth in the genus Endotricha. It is found in Australia.

References

Moths described in 1891
Endotrichini